The Harvard Branch Railroad was a short-lived branch from the Fitchburg Railroad to Harvard Square and Harvard University in Cambridge, Massachusetts. Part of the former right-of-way is now used by Museum Street.

On April 19, 1854 it was authorized to abandon the line, and did so in 1855. The Cambridge Railroad started running to Harvard from Boston in 1856 as a street railway, via a different route.

References

Railroad History Database

Defunct Massachusetts railroads
Predecessors of the Boston and Maine Railroad